"Huele a Peligro" ("I Sense Danger") is a song written by Armando Manzanero and performed by Chilean singer Myriam Hernández. It was released as the lead single from her album, Todo el Amor (1998), her first under Sony Discos having left WEA Latina a year earlier. The song was released to radio stations on 30 March 1998 while its music video premiered the following day. 
Mark Holston of America magazine called it a "poignant pop ballad". It was recognized as one of the best-performing Latin songs of the year at the 1999 BMI Latin Awards. "Huele a Peligro" was covered by Puerto Rican merengue singer Gisselle on her album, Atada (1998). Gisselle's version peaked at number nine and two on the Billboard Hot Latin Songs and Tropical Airplay charts, respectively.

Charts

Weekly charts

Year-end charts

See also 
List of Billboard Latin Pop Airplay number ones of 1998

References

1998 singles
1998 songs
1990s ballads
Myriam Hernández songs
Gisselle songs
Pop ballads
Spanish-language songs
Song recordings produced by Walter Afanasieff
Songs written by Armando Manzanero
Sony Discos singles